The Chief Roughneck Award has presented annually since 1955 by U.S. Steel Tubular Products, Inc., a subsidiary of United States Steel Corporation.  It honors the highest ideals of the petroleum industry and is awarded to honor the achievements and character of a petroleum executive. Recently it has been presented at the annual meeting of the Independent Petroleum Association of America in San Antonio, Texas.

The bronze Joe Roughneck bust, created by Torg Thompson and presented to each Chief Roughneck recipient, began life in Lone Star Steel Company print advertising.

Joe Roughneck's sculpture has been dedicated in several oil patch parks, saluted by governors, and featured in newspaper and magazine articles.

The award is recognized as one of the most meaningful honors in the industry; the award and the character behind it symbolize the spirit, determination, leadership and integrity of individuals who have made a lasting impression on the energy industry.

Winners

2014 – Jeffrey L. Ventura, president and chief executive officer, Range Resources
2013 – Bruce H. Vincent, president and director, Swift Energy Company
2012 – Charles D. Davidson, chairman and CEO, Noble Energy, Inc.
2011 – Michael C. Linn, executive chairman, Linn Energy, LLC
2010 – Aubrey K. McClendon, chairman and CEO, Chesapeake Energy Corporation
2009 – Harold Korell, chairman of the board, Southwestern Energy Company
2008 – Diemer True, chairman and founder, The Diamond Companies of Wyoming
2007 – John B. Walker, president and chief executive officer, EnerVest, Ltd.
2006 – Mark Papa, president, EOG Resources, Inc.
2005 – Ray L. Hunt, chief executive officer, Hunt Oil Company
2004 – George M. Yates, chairman and president, HEYCO Energy Group, Inc.
2003 – Robert J. Allison, Jr., chairman, president and chief executive officer, Anadarko Petroleum Corporation
2002 – Robert L. Nance, president and chief executive officer, Nance Petroleum Corporation
2001 – James Cleo Thompson, Jr., chairman and president, Thompson Petroleum Corporation
2000 – J. Larry Nichols, chairman, president and chief executive officer, Devon Energy
1999 – Lew O. Ward, chairman and chief executive officer, Ward Petroleum
1998 – Jon Rex Jones, chairman, Jones Energy, Ltd. and, chairman, EnerVest Management Company
1997 – George A. Alcorn, president, Alcorn Exploration
1996 – John A. Yates, president, Yates Petroleum Corporation
1995 – Eugene L. Ames, Jr., chairman, president and chief executive officer, Venus Exploration Inc.
1994 – C.J. (Pete) Silas, chairman, Phillips Petroleum Company
1993 – Danny H. Conklin, partner, Philcon Development Company
1992 – Irene S. Wischer, president and chief executive officer, Panhandle Producing Company
1991 – George P. Mitchell, chairman and president, Mitchell Energy & Development Company
1990 – Chester R. Upham, owner and general manager, Upham Gas Company
1989 – Raymond H. Hefner Jr., chairman and chief executive officer, Bonray Energy Corporation
1988 – Robert G. Fowler, president and chief operating officer, Enserch Exploration
1987 – E.L. (Chick) Williamson, chairman and chief executive officer, Louisiana Land and Exploration Company
1986 – Lloyd N. Unsell, president, IPAA
1985 – A.V. Jones Jr., chairman, Jones Company
1984 – Kye Trout Jr., owner and chief executive officer, Energy Resources
1983 – Dean A. McGee, chairman and chief executive officer, Kerr-McGee
1982 – Jack M. Allen, president and chief executive officer, Alpar Resources
1981 – Robert O. Anderson, chairman and chief executive officer, Atlantic Richfield
1980 – Edwin L. Cox, chairman and chief executive officer, Cox Oil & Gas Company
1979 – L. Frank Pitts, owner, Pitts Oil Company
1978 – J. Hugh Liedtke, chairman and chief executive officer, Pennzoil Company
1977 – Charles H. Murphy Jr., chairman, Murphy Oil Company
1976 – R.L. (Bob) Foree, owner, Foree Oil
1975 – C. John Miller, partner, Miller Brothers
1974 – Roy Guffey, owner, Roy Guffey Drilling Company
1973 – Wayne E. Glenn, president, Continental Oil Company
1972 – W.A. Moncrief, president and chief executive officer, Moncrief Oil
1971 – M.A. (Mike) Wright, chairman and chief executive officer, Humble Oil & Refining Company
1970 – W.F. (Dink) Dalton, president, Placid Oil Company
1969 – Jack E. Kadane, owner, G.E. Kadane & Son
1968 – L.B. Meaders, chief executive officer, Halliburton Company
1967 – E.D. Brockett Jr., chairman and chief executive officer, Gulf Oil Corporation
1966 – H.L. Hunt, chairman and chief executive officer, Hunt Oil Company
1965 – H.A. (Dave) True, partner, True Oil and True Drilling
1964 – J. Harold Dunn, chairman, Shamrock Oil and Gas Corporation
1963 – Bruce C. Clardy, president, L.R. Development, Limited
1962 – partner, Rowan and Hope
1961 – Johnny Mitchell, president, Jade Oil, vice chairman, Christie, Mitchell & Mitchell
1960 – Earl Hollandsworth, partner, Hollandsworth Oil Company
1959 – J.L. (Slatz) Latimer, chairman, Magnolia Petroleum and Magnolia Pipe Line Company
1958 – Guy I. Warren, vice president and part owner, Renwar Oil Corporation
1957 – Arch Rowan, owner, Rowan Drilling Company
1956 – Jake L. Hamon, partner, Hamon Oil
1955 – R.E. (Bob) Smith, independent

References

External links
Official site of winners
Meet Joe Roughneck

U.S. Steel
American awards
Awards established in 1955
Business and industry awards
Drilling technology
1955 establishments in Texas